Anatole von Hügel (29 September 1854, in Florence – 15 August 1928, in Cambridge) was the second son of the Austrian nobleman.

Early life 
Born into the German noble House of Hügel, he was the son of Baron Charles von Hügel and his Scottish wife Elizabeth Farquharson. His elder brother was Friedrich von Hügel and his sister was Pauline von Hügel.

Biography 
His family moved to England in 1867 after his father's retirement, and he was educated at Stonyhurst College. From 1874 to 1878 he collected natural history specimens in Australia, New Zealand, Fiji, Samoa, and Java. He became an authority of Fiji, after his lengthy travels in the practically unknown interior of Viti Levu to record the original Fijian culture before the British colonization.

In 1880 he married Eliza Margaret Froude, daughter of William Froude and in 1883 he became the first curator of the University of Cambridge Museum of Archaeology and Anthropology. He remained curator until 1921, raising funds for the new building. In 1889 he was admitted to Trinity College, Cambridge and received an MA. Hügel was founder and first president (1895 to 1922) of the Cambridge University Catholic Association, and would go on to co-found St Edmund's College, Cambridge with Henry Fitzalan-Howard, 15th Duke of Norfolk. There is a memorial plaque to Baron Anatole von Hügel on the wall in the St John Fisher chapel of the Catholic Church in Cambridge (Our Lady & English Martyrs, Lensfield Road, Cambridge). He was buried in Cambridge Cemetery on 20 August 1928, as was his wife, a member of the Cambridge Ladies Dining Society with 11 other members.

Hügel privately published a biography of his father in 1903.

References

The Fiji Journals of Baron Anatole Von Hugel 1875-1877, Roth, Jane and Steven Hooper (eds.),  Suva: Fiji Museum in association with Cambridge University Museum of Archaeology, 1990
Baron Anatole von Hugel, Obituary by A. C. Haddon & Alfred P. Maudslay in Man, Vol. 28 pp 169–171 (Oct. 1928)
'Anatole von Hugel, Baron'', Peter W. Allott in the Oxford Dictionary of National Biography

External links
biographical sketch The Von Hügel Institute. St Edmund's College, Cambridge

1854 births
1928 deaths
Nobility from Florence
Austrian anthropologists
History of Fiji
Barons of Austria
Austrian Roman Catholics
Scottish Roman Catholics
Alumni of Trinity College, Cambridge
Fellows of St Edmund's College, Cambridge
Academics of the University of Cambridge
Catholic Church in Cambridge
Austrian naturalists
British expatriates in Fiji
Austro-Hungarian emigrants to the United Kingdom
Scottish people of Austrian descent
Anatole
Founders of colleges of the University of Cambridge